Sodium- and chloride-dependent taurine transporter is a protein that in humans is encoded by the SLC6A6 gene.

References

Further reading

Solute carrier family